Edit Music for a Film: Original Motion Picture Soundtrack Reconstruction is a two-disc UNKLE remix album/sound collection mixing together various musical styles, movie soundbites and UNKLE production. This was done for the 'After Dark' event in the ICA, London. James Lavelle put together a mix of soundtracks from films that inspired him the most. As the album notes point out: 2001: A Space Odyssey, Dune, Dog Day Afternoon, Kill Bill, Sexy Beast, Training Day, and Blade Runner amongst others.

The first disc Widescreen Edit – A New Hope, which is taken from the first original Star Wars film Star Wars Episode IV: A New Hope, and mainly focuses on inventive usage of film dialogue and scores. The second disc Bonus Material Edit – Strikes Back, which is likely a contraction of the second made Star Wars film The Empire Strikes Back, focuses more on rhythm and long stretches of film-inspired "dance" music without the heavy inventiveness of the previous disc.

Track listing

Disc 1: Widescreen Edit – A New Hope
 20th Century Fox Logo
 Unkle Vs. The Lox Feat. DMX & Lil' Kim Vs. Joe Budden - Intro/Money, Power, Respect/Focus
 THX Deep Note
 2001: A Space Odyssey Sample
 Richard Strauss – Also Sprach Zarathustra (Main Theme) (UNKLESounds Edit)
 2001: A Space Odyssey Sample
 Unkle - Blackout with Dune samples.
 Unkle - Lonely Souls Vs. Massive Attack - End Titles (Welcome To Sarajevo soundtrack)
 A Clockwork Orange Sample
 Walter Carlos - Title Music From A Clockwork Orange 
 Massive Attack Feat. Mos Def - I Against I 
 Genuine Childs - Scarface DVD Menu Score 
 Tonight's Presentation (Kill Bill Sample)
 DJ Shadow Feat. Roots Manuva Vs. Tomoyasu Hotei - GDMFSOB (Unkle Uncensored Mix)/Battle Without Honor or Humanity
 Nellee Hooper Feat. Justin Warfield - The Montague Boys/O Verona 
 Eyes Wide Shut Sample
 Chris Isaak - Baby Did a Bad Bad Thing (UNKLEsounds Edit) 
 Sid Vicious - My Way 
 Vangelis - Blush Response (UNKLEsounds Edit)
 Unkle Vs. Dillinja - Safe In Mind/Angels Fell 
 THX 1138 Sample
 Unkle - I Need Something Stronger 
 The Jud Conlon Chorus and The Mellomen  - The Second Star to the Right

Disc 2: Bonus Material Edit – Strikes Back
 MGM Sample
 Lost In Translation Sample
 2010 Sample
 Unkle - Eye For An Eye (Strings Section)
 Unkle & South - Cocaine and Camcorders (UNKLE variation) 
 Unkle & South - Paranoid (UNKLE variation) 
 Thomas Bangalter - Night Beats
 The Thin Red Line Sample
 Unkle - Have You Passed Through This Night? 
 Dylan Rhymes - Assault on Precinct 13 - The Way/Radio Spot 
 Solaris Sample
 Meat Katie Vs. Cliff Martinez - Next Life/Is That What Everybody Wants?
 Uma Thurman - A Few Words From the Bride
 Nancy Sinatra - Bang Bang (My Baby Shot Me Down) (UNKLEsounds Edit)
 Alive Sample
 Unkle Vs. Moby - In a State/God Moving Over the Face of the Waters 
 Elton John - Tiny Dancer (UNKLEsounds edit) 
 Outro - Scarface Restaurant Scene

External links
Edit Music For A Film at Discogs

Unkle albums
2005 remix albums